Martín Buesa (born 24 August 1988, Vitoria-Gasteiz) is a Spanish professional basketball player.

Buesa played for Caja Laboral from 2008 to 2011. After leaving the team, Buesa joined UPV Álava at Liga EBA and later, in 2012, for Araberri BC at LEB Plata.

References

External links
Profile at ACB.com
Profile at FEB.es

1988 births
Living people
Araberri BC players
Liga ACB players
Saski Baskonia players
Spanish men's basketball players
Power forwards (basketball)